Nauru competed at the 2020 Summer Olympics in Tokyo. Originally scheduled to take place from 24 July to 9 August 2020, the Games have been postponed to 23 July to 8 August 2021, due to the COVID-19 pandemic. It was the nations seventh appearance at the Summer Olympics since its debut in 1996.

Competitors
The following is the list of number of competitors in the Games.

Athletics

Nauru received a universality invitation from the World Athletics to send a male track and field athlete to the Olympics. Jonah Harris was the first ever (track and field) athlete of Nauru to participate at the Games.

Track & road events

Weightlifting

Nauru received an invitation from the Tripartite Commission and the International Weightlifting Federation to send Nancy Genzel Abouke in the women's 76 kg category to the Olympics.

References

Olympics
2020
Nations at the 2020 Summer Olympics